Norway has participated in the Eurovision Song Contest 60 times since making its debut in  and has only been absent twice since then. In 1970, the country boycotted the contest over disagreements about the voting structure, and in 2002, they were relegated. The contest is broadcast in Norway by NRK, which also broadcasts Norway's national selection competition, Melodi Grand Prix.

Norway also finished second at the  contest, with former Bobbysocks member Elisabeth Andreassen. Norway has finished last in eleven Eurovision finals, of which four times with "nul points". In 2019, Norway became the third televote-winning country to not win the contest (the previous ones being Italy in 2015 and Russia in 2016).

History
Before , Norway had only received a top-ten score in six out of twenty-four attempts, and had finished last the same number of times.

Bobbysocks gave the country its first victory in 1985, with the song "La det swinge".

Norway's second victory came in 1995 with Secret Garden's mainly instrumental Celtic-influenced ethno-piece "Nocturne". In , Elisabeth Andreassen, who had won the contest as one half of Bobbysocks, returned to the contest as a solo artist, finishing in second place. In , Jostein Hasselgård came fourth.

The song’s score of 387 points was the highest ever winning total under the 1975-2015 voting system, and also achieved the biggest ever margin of victory: 492 points in total were distributed between the competing countries in 2009, meaning "Fairytale" received 78.7% of the points that could be rewarded. He remains the only Norwegian entrant to have won a semi-final, as well as the only two-time semi-final winner in the history of the contest.

In , Norway finished last in the final for the eleventh time.

Since the introduction of the semi-final round in 2004, Norway has finished in the top ten seven times. In total, Norway has eleven top-five and twenty-five top-ten finishes in the contest.

Participation overview

Hostings

Songs of Europe

Awards

Marcel Bezençon Awards

Winner by OGAE members

Related involvement

Conductors

Additionally, there was an orchestra present at the 1999 national final, conducted by Geir Langslet (the winning song, however, was presented without orchestral accompaniment) and at the 2015 national final, conducted by Anders Eljas.

Heads of delegation

Supervisors 
List of supervisors of Melodi Grand Prix, better known as MGP-general or GP-general in Norway:

Commentators and spokespersons

Gallery

See also
Melodi Grand Prix
Norway in the Junior Eurovision Song Contest – Junior version of the Eurovision Song Contest.
Norway in the Eurovision Young Dancers – A competition organised by the EBU for younger dancers aged between 16 and 21.
Norway in the Eurovision Young Musicians – A competition organised by the EBU for musicians aged 18 years and younger.

Notes and references

Notes

References

External links 
 Melodi Grand Prix
 Points to and from Norway eurovisioncovers.co.uk

 
Countries in the Eurovision Song Contest
Melodi Grand Prix